Bill Henderson (born 23 November 1929) is an Australian former football (soccer) player who played as a goalkeeper.

Henderson's debut for Australia in 1954 was historic as he became the first second-generation Socceroo—his father Andy Henderson had represented the national team in 1924. Henderson was a member of the Australian team at the 1956 Summer Olympics.

References

Living people
1929 births
Australian soccer players
Association football goalkeepers
Olympic soccer players of Australia
Footballers at the 1956 Summer Olympics